Liam Broady was the defending champion but chose not to defend his title.

Jurij Rodionov won the title after defeating Kacper Żuk 7–6(7–3), 6–4 in the final.

Seeds

Draw

Finals

Top half

Bottom half

References

External links
Main draw
Qualifying draw

Challenger Biel/Bienne - 1